OmniFocus is a personal task manager by the Omni Group for macOS and iOS. The declared goal of the program is to be able to capture thoughts and ideas into to do lists. The program uses concepts and techniques described in the book and productivity system called Getting Things Done (GTD) by David Allen.

History 
OmniFocus has its roots in the Kinkless kGTD add/scripts for the Omni Group's OmniOutliner product. Kinkless (kGTD) was developed by Ethan J. A. Schoonover to enable those following the GTD methodology.  The Omni Group subsequently brought Ethan along with Merlin Mann to form a project team to create the OmniFocus application.

In 2018, version 3 of OmniFocus was released for iOS and macOS. With the release, the previous concept of contexts taken from GTD was replaced with tags.

Platforms

macOS
OmniFocus is available for macOS.

iOS
OmniFocus is available on iOS (including the iPod Touch, iPhone, and iPad).

Android
The Omni Group does not have plans to provide an Android application for OmniFocus. Google Play lists various third-party applications that interface with OmniFocus through the Omni Sync Server (e.g., Focus GTD).

Web application 
On January 26, 2018, Ken Case, CEO of the Omni Group, announced in the Omni Group forums that OmniFocus for the web is under development. It will not be a standalone version; it will only sync with existing databases set up with the macOS or iOS versions of OmniFocus. A subscription fee will be charged for access. In December 2018, Ken Case shared more details about the upcoming subscription service, where users could subscribe to get access to both the native OmniFocus apps and OmniFocus for the web, or just the latter with a reduced subscription fee. The option to make one-time purchases of the macOS and iOS apps will remain.

See also
 Getting Things Done
 Things
 Taskwarrior
 Org-mode

References

External links
 
 

Focus
IOS software
Task management software
Personal information manager software for macOS
MacOS software
IPadOS software